{{hatnote|This is an article about a Greek revolutionary group. For the Marxist theory, see World revolution. For the Irish militant group, see Revolutionary Struggle (Ireland).}}

Revolutionary Struggle (EA; Greek: Επαναστατικός Αγώνας, Epanastatikos Agonas) is a Greek anarchist, anti-imperialist, urban guerrilla group known for its attacks on Greek government buildings and the American embassy in Athens. It is designated as a terrorist group by the Greek government, the European Union (EU), and the United States. 

2003–2007 attacks
The group first emerged in 2003 with a bombing attack on an Athens courthouse complex, following that up with attacks in 2004 on Citibank and an Athens police station. In May 2004, the group published its first manifesto in the Greek satirical magazine, To Pontiki, in which it expressed revolutionary, anarchist, anti-globalisation and anti-imperialist ideological aims. Following a January 12, 2007, RPG-7 attack on the U.S. Embassy, Greek authorities mistakenly described the group as a spinoff of Revolutionary Organization 17 November. The group attacked a police station in Nea Ionia several months later. These attacks led to Revolutionary Struggle becoming Greece's biggest domestic security threat since the 17 November Group disbanded in 2002.

In a statement published in To Pontiki'' on January 25, 2007, Revolutionary Struggle admitted that it had carried out the embassy attack, claiming that the "strike was our answer to the criminal war against 'terrorism' that the US has unleashed over the entire planet with the help of fellow-traveling states". The European Union added RS to its list of designated terrorist organizations on June 29, 2007.  On May 18, 2009, a U.S. State Department spokesman announced in a press briefing that U.S. Secretary of State Hillary Clinton had formally designated Revolutionary Struggle as a foreign terrorist organization under the U.S. Immigration and Nationality Act.

Investigation
In January 2009, Greek police said their ballistics tests showed the weapon used in RS's 30 April 2007 attack was used again in a 5 January 2009 shooting of a police officer.  A second weapon used in 5 January attack was tied by the police to a 23 December 2008 attack on a police bus.  That attack was reported to have been claimed by a group calling itself Popular Action (Λαϊκή Δράση, Laiki Drasi), as a response to the 2008 civil unrest in Greece.

Arrests
On March 10, 2010, two men were spotted breaking into a car (SEAT Ibiza) in Dafni, Attica at 4:40am and possibly resisted arrest by firing on the police officers. One of them, Lambros Fountas, who was later found to have been on the terrorist watch list since 1995, was shot dead, but the other escaped. However, the escapee left forensic evidence which linked him to previous terrorist attacks.

In April 2010 after a long investigation, six suspected members of the group were apprehended. The subsequent investigation led police to over €119,000 in cash, Zastava handguns, fake identification documents which were used to rent safehouses, explosives (195 kg of ANFO hidden in a motorbike garage) and detailed plans of future terrorist attacks.

Later, police investigating another address in Kypseli rented under another false ID used by the suspects discovered an RPG-7. Other weapons discovered there included many hand grenades, two Kalashnikovs and an MP5 submachine gun that ballistics later linked conclusively to previous attacks.

In late April 2010, the three prime suspects being held confirmed their involvement in Revolutionary Struggle in a letter to the press, but denied that the government could prove they participated in the actions related to their charges. The three also promised to continue their revolutionary activities as long as they are living.

Pola Roupa and Nikos Maziotis, who both openly admit their involvement in Revolutionary Struggle, were convicted for their participation in the group's activities in absentia after absconding with their son in 2012. Maziotis was captured in 2014 and Roupa in 2017.

On January 31, 2020, Konstantina Athanasopoulou was arrested along with Giannis Michailidis, a Greek anarchist known as “the archer of Syntagma” convicted of an armed bank robbery in 2013 and for an armed attack on members of the police force’s immediate response unit in 2015 and had in a year prior  to the arrest escaped a prison in Tyrinth, and an unnamed woman were captured by Anti-Terrorism police, claiming the trio were heavily armed.

Prison 
Nikolaos Maziotis, the reported leader  of Revolutionary Struggle disappeared in April 2014 during his trial at Korydallos prison but was captured in July 2014 after a shootout with police Central Athens during a robbery, leaving himself and two others including one police officer injured. In 2016 Maziotis again attempted escape when Pola Roupa attempted to help romantic partner and fellow EA member Maziotis along with other political prisoners escape from prison via a hijacked helicopter. Reportedly Roupa rented a helicopter before pulling a pistol on the pilot, a retired police officer, in an attempt to force him to fly over the prison. The pilot instead started a landing and attempted to force the weapon from Roupa. Two shots were fired in the struggle, with an ammunition clip as well as a wig Roupa used as part of her disguise were left behind as she fled.

List of attacks
 January 2007: Grenade fired at American embassy facade in Athens
 April 2007: Shots fired at police station in Athens suburb of Nea Ionia
 October 2008: Failed bomb attempt on Royal Dutch Shell's headquarters in south Athens
 January 2009: In response to the killing of Alexandros Grigoropoulos, shots fired at police guarding the Ministry of Culture building in Athens, seriously wounding one police officer
 March 2009: Two bomb attacks on Citibank branches in Athens
 May 2009: Bomb attack on a Eurobank Ergasias branch in suburban Athens.
 3 July 2009: Suspected bomb attack on a McDonald's in Athens Ambelokipi district causes "extensive damage."
 September 2009: Explosion outside the Athens stock exchange causing minor injuries to one woman and significant damage to the surrounding area. A second bomb in Thessaloniki causing minor damage and no injuries.
 13 May 2010: A bomb exploded outside Korydallos Prison in Athens, injuring a woman. Police suspected the Revolutionary Struggle.
 14 May 2010: Only one day after the bomb-explosion in Athens, a second bomb exploded in the court of Thessaloniki. One person was injured. The building got heavily damaged inside.
 25 June 2010: A parcel bomb exploded within the Greek Ministry of Public Order. The bomb was addressed to the Minister of Public Order, Michalis Chrysohoidis, but was instead opened by Giorgos Vassilakis, his aide. Giorgos was killed in the attack. While not immediately claimed by Revolutionary Struggle, Greek terrorism expert Dr Athanasios Drougas said the attack was likely carried out by the group.
 10 April 2014: Car bomb attack on a Bank of Greece and a Piraeus Bank headquarters in central Athens. 76 kg of explosives located in a car went off destroying front facades of buildings around. No persons injured. The action was claimed later by Revolutionary Struggle in Athens Indymedia.
2016 hijacking of a helicopter and attempted escape of an imprisoned member.

See also
 Terrorism in Greece

References

External links
 Official site
 Revolutionary Struggle (PDF)
 MIPT Terrorism Knowledge Base 

Left-wing militant groups in Greece
Communist militant groups
Terrorism in Greece
Anarchist organizations in Greece
Anarchist militant groups
Organizations designated as terrorist by the United States
Organizations based in Europe designated as terrorist
Insurrectionary anarchism
Communist terrorism
Organisations designated as terrorist by the European Union